C. californiensis  may refer to:
 Calcinus californiensis, a hermit crab species
 Catocala californiensis, a moth species found in southern California

See also
 List of Latin and Greek words commonly used in systematic names#C